The 1988 United States Senate election in Vermont took place on November 8, 1988. Incumbent Republican Robert Stafford did not run for re-election to another term in the United States Senate. Republican candidate Jim Jeffords defeated Democratic candidate Bill Gray to succeed him.

Republican primary

Results

Democratic primary

Results

General election

Polling

Results

See also 
 1988 United States Senate elections
 1988 United States House of Representatives election in Vermont
 1988 United States presidential election in Vermont
 1988 Vermont gubernatorial election

References 

Vermont
1988
United States Senate